Sosticus insularis is a spider in the family Gnaphosidae ("ground spiders"), in the infraorder Araneomorphae ("true spiders").
The distribution range of Sosticus insularis includes the USA and Canada.

References

External links
NCBI Taxonomy Browser, Sosticus insularis

Gnaphosidae
Spiders described in 1895